Central African Republic competed at the 2020 Summer Paralympics in Tokyo, Japan, from 24 August to 5 September 2021. This was their fifth consecutive appearance at the Summer Paralympics since 2004.

Athletics 

Women's field

See also 
 Central African Republic at the Paralympics
 Central African Republic at the 2020 Summer Olympics

External links 
 Paralympics website 

Nations at the 2020 Summer Paralympics
2020
2021 in Central African Republic sport